Bad Oeynhausen is a railway station  in the town of Bad Oeynhausen, North Rhine-Westphalia, Germany. The station lies on the Hamm–Minden railway and the train services are operated by Deutsche Bahn and WestfalenBahn.

Bad Oeynhausen has another station Bad Oeynhausen Süd, 1 km south of this station.

Train services
The station is served by the following service(s):

Intercity services (IC 77) Amsterdam - Amersfoort - Hengelo - Osnabrück - Hanover - Berlin
Regional services  Minden – Bad Oeynhausen – Herford – Bielefeld – Hamm – Dortmund – Essen – Duisburg – Düsseldorf Airport – Düsseldorf – Neuss – Cologne – Cologne/Bonn Airport
Regional services  Rheine - Osnabrück - Minden - Hanover - Braunschweig
Regional services  Bielefeld - Herford - Minden - Hanover - Braunschweig
Regional services  Bielefeld - Herford - Minden - Nienburg

References

External links

Railway stations in North Rhine-Westphalia
Railway stations in Germany opened in 1847
1847 establishments in Prussia
Buildings and structures in Minden-Lübbecke